The .22 Remington Automatic (also known as the .22 Remington Auto and occasionally .22 Rem Auto) is a .22in (5.6mm) American rimfire rifle cartridge.

Introduced for the Remington Model 16 semiautomatic rifle in 1916, the .22 Rem Auto was never used in any other firearm. It will not chamber correctly in other .22 rimfire weapons, nor will other .22 rimfire ammunition, including the dimensionally very similar .22 Winchester Automatic, interchange with it. This feature was to prevent use of black powder rounds, which were still popular when it first appeared, from being used in the Model 16, resulting in powder residue rapidly clogging the action and rendering the weapon inoperable.

The power of the .22 Remington Auto is comparable to the .22 Long rimfire, and while it fires a heavier bullet, it offers no performance edge on either the .22 Long or the very much more common .22 Long Rifle. It is not as accurate or as effective as the .22 LR, either.

See also
List of cartridges by caliber
List of rifle cartridges
List of rimfire cartridges
5mm caliber

References

Notes
Barnes, Frank C., ed. by John T. Amber. ".22 Remington Automatic", in Cartridges of the World, pp. 275, 282, & 283. Northfield, IL: DBI Books, 1972. .
__ & _. ".22 Winchester Automatic", in Cartridges of the World, pp. 275 & 283. Northfield, IL: DBI Books, 1972. .

External links

 TINCANBANDIT On The Forgotten Remington Model 16

Pistol and rifle cartridges
Remington Arms cartridges
Rimfire cartridges
Weapons and ammunition introduced in 1916